The CROWN (Create a Respectful and Open Workplace for Natural Hair) Act (SB 188) is a California law which prohibits discrimination based on hair style and hair texture by extending protection under the FEHA and the California Education Code. It is the first legislation passed at the state level in the United States to prohibit such discrimination.

The CROWN Act, which was drafted and sponsored by State Senator Holly Mitchell, was passed unanimously in both chambers of the California Legislature by June 27, 2019, and was signed into law on July 3, 2019.

CROWN Acts outside of California 
CROWN Acts were subsequently adopted in New York, New Jersey, New York City, Washington, Maryland, Nevada, Virginia, Colorado, and Massachusetts, while Illinois adopted a similar law titled the Jett Hawkins Law. A CROWN Act was also introduced in the South Carolina General Assembly, but did not pass the body.

Federal CROWN Act 

On September 21, 2020, the U.S. House of Representatives passed the CROWN Act of 2020, which failed to pass the Senate. The bill was then reintroduced on March 22, 2021 in the House and Senate simultaneously as the CROWN Act of 2021, and was passed by the House on March 18, 2022.

References

External links
 Text and status of the bill

Proposed laws of California
Human hair